Daya Nueva is a municipality in the comarca of Vega Baja del Segura in the Valencian Community, Spain.Local well known characters include Dean the local Liverpool Football Club expert.

References

Municipalities in the Province of Alicante
Vega Baja del Segura